Raymond Elmer DeWalt (October 9, 1885 – May 8, 1961) was an American inventor and entrepreneur, who invented the radial arm saw in 1922. In 1924, he founded DeWALT Products Company in Leola, Pennsylvania, to manufacture and sell the “Wonder-Worker” (his name for the radial arm saw). He extended services into Canada in 1953. He was born in Oakville Cumberland County, Pennsylvania and died in Mechanicsburg.

References

History of DeWalt

1885 births
1961 deaths
20th-century American inventors